Leila Françoise Lassouani (born July 29, 1977 in France) is a female weightlifter from Algeria. In 2006, she was named the best Algerian Sportsperson along with swimmer Salim Iles by the Algerian Press.

At the 2008 African Weightlifting Championships she won the gold medal in the 63 kg category, with a total of 205 kg.

She was the only Algerian weightlifter qualified to compete at the 2008 Beijing Olympic Games. In the Olympic tournament she did not finish due to failed attempts in the clean and jerk.

Results 

Sydney 2000 Olympic Games
 
Women's 58 kg: finished 14th

Athens 2004 Olympic Games

Women's 63 kg: finished  7th

References
sports-reference

External links
 Athlete Biography at beijing2008

1977 births
Living people
Algerian female weightlifters
French sportspeople of Algerian descent
Weightlifters at the 2000 Summer Olympics
Weightlifters at the 2004 Summer Olympics
Weightlifters at the 2008 Summer Olympics
Olympic weightlifters of Algeria
African Games gold medalists for Algeria
African Games medalists in weightlifting
Mediterranean Games gold medalists for Algeria
Mediterranean Games silver medalists for Algeria
Mediterranean Games medalists in weightlifting
Competitors at the 2007 All-Africa Games
Competitors at the 2005 Mediterranean Games
20th-century Algerian women
21st-century Algerian women